Hoplopleura oryzomydis is a sucking louse that is known from the southern United States, Nicaragua, Panama, and Venezuela. It is known from several oryzomyine rodents: the marsh rice rat (Oryzomys palustris), O. couesi, Handleyomys alfaroi, Transandinomys talamancae, Melanomys caliginosus, and Sigmodontomys alfari.

References

Literature cited

Lice
Insects of North America
Insects described in 1951